Neotimyra is a genus of moths in the family Lecithoceridae.

Species
 Neotimyra gyriola Park, 2011
 Neotimyra milleri Park, 2011
 Neotimyra nemoralis Park, 2011
 Neotimyra senara Park, 2011
 Neotimyra warkapiensis Park, 2011

References

 
Lecithocerinae
Moth genera